Tarell Alvin McCraney (born October 17, 1980) is an American playwright, screenwriter, and actor. He is the chair of playwriting at the Yale School of Drama and a member of the Steppenwolf Theatre Ensemble.

He co-wrote the 2016 film Moonlight, based on his own play, for which he received an Academy Award for Best Adapted Screenplay. He also wrote the screenplay for the 2019 film High Flying Bird and 2019 television series David Makes Man.

Early life and education

McCraney was born in Liberty City, Florida. He attended the New World School of the Arts (NWSA) in Miami, Florida. While attending NWSA, he also applied to and was awarded an honorable mention by the National YoungArts Foundation (1999, Theater). As a teenager, he was a member of an improv troupe directed by Teo Castellanos.

He matriculated into The Theatre School at DePaul University and received his BFA in acting. In May 2007 he graduated from Yale School of Drama's playwriting program, receiving the Cole Porter Playwriting Award upon graduation. He also is an Honorary Warwick University Graduate.

Career 
As an actor, he has worked with directors such as Tina Landau of the Steppenwolf Theatre Company, Chicago, Illinois, David Cromer, and B. J. Jones, artistic director of the Northlight Theatre (where McCraney co-starred in the Chicago premiere of Joe Penhall's Blue/Orange), and developed a working relationship with Peter Brook and Marie-Hélène Estienne of the Bouffes du Nord, Paris. He is a member of the D Projects Theater Company in Miami.

From 2008 to 2010, he was the RSC/Warwick International Playwright in Residence at the Royal Shakespeare Company. In April 2010, McCraney became the 43rd member of the Steppenwolf Theatre Ensemble. In July 2017, he became the chair of playwriting at the Yale School of Drama.

Theatre
 While at Yale, McCraney wrote the Brother/Sister trilogy of plays, which are set in the Louisiana projects and explore Yoruba mythology. The triptych of plays includes In the Red Brown Water, The Brothers Size, and Marcus; Or the Secret of Sweet. While they are often produced with In the Red Brown Water coming first and then The Brothers Size and Marcus; Or the Secret of Sweet together on a following night, the plays are not in chronological order, but rather are “in conversation” with one another. 
 McCraney’s play Choir Boy premiered at the Royal Court Theatre in London in 2012, with its American premiere the following year produced by the Manhattan Theatre Club. The play follows young Pharus on his journey toward becoming the best choir leader in the history of the Charles R. Drew Prep School for Boys and trying to find out where he fits in with the rest of his peers.  The 2019 Broadway production of the play was nominated for four Tony Awards, including the Tony Award for Best Play, and won the Tony Award for Best Sound Design of a Play. 
 McCraney co-wrote Ms. Blakk for President with director Tina Landau. The show was first performed by the Steppenwolf Theatre Company in Chicago in 2019. Based on a true story, the play follows drag queen Joan Jett Blakk (played by McCraney himself in the play's first production) in Chicago at the height of the AIDS crisis as she announces her bid to run for President of the United States.

Television
 McCraney writes and is an executive producer for the original scripted TV series, David Makes Man, for Oprah Winfrey’s OWN Network.  As of April 2022, the show is awaiting renewal for its third season.

Film
 Moonlight, co-written by McCraney and director Barry Jenkins, was based on McCraney’s earlier semi-autobiographical play In Moonlight Black Boys Look Blue, which he shelved.  The film follows Chiron (Alex R. Hibbert, Ashton Sanders, Trevante Rhodes), a young Black man who grapples with his identity and sexuality while experiencing the everyday struggles of childhood, adolescence, and burgeoning adulthood in Miami. The film was critically acclaimed, and McCraney and Jenkins won the Academy Award for Best Adapted Screenplay.
 McCraney wrote the screenplay for the 2019 American sports drama, High Flying Bird, directed by Steven Soderbergh and released by Netflix. The film follows sports agent Ray Burke (André Holland) who finds himself caught between a league and its basketball players.

Personal life
McCraney is gay.

Works

Plays
Ms. Blakk for President (Steppenwolf Theatre)
Head of Passes (Steppenwolf Theatre, Berkeley Rep, The Public Theater)
Choir Boy (Royal Court, Manhattan Theatre Club, Samuel J. Friedman Theatre, Steppenwolf Theatre)
American Trade, an adaptation of a Restoration comedy for young people (RSC)
 Wig Out! (developed at Sundance Theatre Lab produced in New York by the Vineyard Theatre and in London by the Royal Court)

The Brother/Sister Plays trilogy  

 The Brothers Size (simultaneously premiered in New York at The Public Theater, in association with the Foundry Theatre, and in London at the Young Vic, where it was nominated for an Olivier Award for Outstanding Achievement at an Affiliated Theatre)
 In The Red and Brown Water (winner of the Kendeda Graduate Playwriting Competition, produced at the Alliance Theatre and the Young Vic) 
Marcus, or the Secret of Sweet

Other plays 

Without/Sin
 Run, Mourner, Run (adapted from Randall Kenan's short story), both of which premiered at Yale Cabaret. He directed Hamlet for the RSC's Young Shakespeare program for GableStage in Miami.

In the summer of 2006, McCraney, Catherine Filloux and Joe Sutton wrote The Breach, a play on Katrina, the Gulf, and our nation, commissioned by Southern Rep in New Orleans, where it premiered in August 2007 to mark the second anniversary of the tragedy in New Orleans. The Breach also played at Seattle Rep in the winter of 2007.

Other projects
 High Flying Bird, a script based on the 2011 NBA lockout starring André Holland, who starred in Moonlight, directed by Steven Soderbergh. It premiered on Netflix on February 8, 2019.
In Moonlight Black Boys Look Blue, an autobiographical drama school project that is the inspiration for the 2016 film Moonlight.
An adaptation of Shakespeare's Antony and Cleopatra for the Royal Shakespeare Company in 2013, which puts the play in an 18th-century Caribbean setting. Reviews were mixed.
 David Makes Man, a 2019 television series on the OWN network.

Forthcoming projects 

Commissions for the Donmar Warehouse and Berkeley Rep.

Awards and honors
2007 Whiting Award
2007 Paula Vogel Playwriting Award for The Brothers Size 
2008 London's Evening Standard Award for Most Promising Playwright
2009 New York Times Outstanding Playwright Award for The Brothers Size
2009 Steinberg Playwright Award
2013 Windham–Campbell Literature Prize
2013 MacArthur Fellowship
2014 Doris Duke Performing Artist Award
2017 Academy Award for Best Adapted Screenplay: Moonlight
2017 PEN/Laura Pels International Foundation for Theater Awards American Playwright in Mid-Career
2017 United States Artists Fellowship
2019 40 Under 40 List by Connecticut Magazine

References

External links
 Profile and Production History at The Whiting Foundation

21st-century American dramatists and playwrights
21st-century American male actors
21st-century American male writers
1980 births
Living people
African-American dramatists and playwrights
American male stage actors
DePaul University alumni
Writers from Florida
American gay actors
American gay writers
LGBT African Americans
Male actors from Miami
Yale School of Drama alumni
American LGBT dramatists and playwrights
American male dramatists and playwrights
Alumni of the British American Drama Academy
Best Adapted Screenplay Academy Award winners
LGBT people from Florida
Steppenwolf Theatre Company players
MacArthur Fellows
21st-century American screenwriters
African-American screenwriters
21st-century African-American writers
20th-century African-American people
African-American male writers